Larry Sanders may refer to:

 Larry Sanders (politician) (born 1935), American-born British academic, social worker, Green Party activist, and brother of Bernie Sanders
 L.V. (singer) (Larry Sanders, born 1957), American rhythm and blues singer
 Larry Sanders (basketball) (born 1988), American professional basketball player
 Larry Sanders, the title character of the TV series The Larry Sanders Show

See also
 Barry Sanders (born 1968), American professional football running back with the Detroit Lions